Anne Nason was a championship golf player for The Country Club in Brookline, Massachusetts. She was a winner of the Clyde Park Challenge Cup in 1913.

References

American female golfers
Year of birth missing
Year of death missing